Peninsula Hotel may refer to:

The Peninsula Hotels, a chain of luxury properties operated by Hongkong and Shanghai Hotels
 The Peninsula Beijing
 The Peninsula Shanghai
 The Peninsula Paris
 The Peninsula Hong Kong
 The Peninsula Tokyo
 The Peninsula Manila
 The Peninsula Bangkok
 The Peninsula Beverly Hills
 The Peninsula Chicago
 The Peninsula New York
 Peninsula Hotel, Singapore, a hotel in Singapore